Orphism (more rarely Orphicism) is the name given to a set of religious beliefs and practices originating in the ancient Greek and Hellenistic world, associated with literature ascribed to the mythical poet Orpheus, who descended into the Greek underworld and returned. This type of journey is called a katabasis and is the basis of several hero worships and journeys. Orphics revered Dionysus (who once descended into the Underworld and returned) and Persephone (who annually descended into the Underworld for a season and then returned). Orphism has been described as a reform of the earlier Dionysian religion, involving a re-interpretation or re-reading of the myth of Dionysus and a re-ordering of Hesiod's Theogony, based in part on pre-Socratic philosophy.

The central focus of Orphism is the suffering and death of the god Dionysus at the hands of the Titans, which forms the basis of Orphism's central myth. According to this myth, the infant Dionysus is killed, torn apart, and consumed by the Titans. In retribution, Zeus strikes the Titans with a thunderbolt, turning them to ash. From these ashes, humanity is born. In Orphic belief, this myth describes humanity as having a dual nature: body, inherited from the Titans, and a divine spark or soul, inherited from Dionysus. In order to achieve salvation from the Titanic, material existence, one had to be initiated into the Dionysian mysteries and undergo teletē, a ritual purification and reliving of the suffering and death of the god. Orphics believed that they would, after death, spend eternity alongside Orpheus and other heroes. The uninitiated, they believed, would be reincarnated indefinitely.

In order to maintain their purity following initiation and ritual, Orphics attempted to live an ascetic life free of spiritual contamination, most notably by adhering to a strict vegetarian diet that also excluded broad beans.

Origins
Orphism is named after the legendary poet-hero Orpheus, who was said to have originated the Mysteries of Dionysus. However, Orpheus was more closely associated with Apollo than to Dionysus in the earliest sources and iconography. According to some versions of his mythos, he was the son of Apollo, and during his last days, he shunned the worship of other gods and devoted himself to Apollo alone.

Poetry containing distinctly Orphic beliefs has been traced back to the 6th century BC or at least 5th century BC, and graffiti of the 5th century BC apparently refers to "Orphics". The Derveni papyrus allows Orphic mythology to be dated to the end of the 5th century BC, and it is probably even older. Orphic views and practices are attested as by Herodotus, Euripides, and Plato. Plato refers to "Orpheus-initiators", and associated rites, although how far "Orphic" literature in general related to these rites is not certain.

Relationship to Pythagoreanism
Orphic views and practices have parallels to elements of Pythagoreanism, and various traditions hold that the Pythagoreans or Pythagoras himself authored early Orphic works; alternately, later philosophers believed that Pythagoras was an initiate of Orphism. The extent to which one movement may have influenced the other remains controversial. Some scholars maintain that Orphism and Pythagoreanism began as separate traditions which later became confused and conflated due to a few similarities. Others argue that the two traditions share a common origin and can even be considered a single entity, termed "Orphico-Pythagoreanism."

The belief that Pythagoreanism was a subset or direct descendant of Orphic religion existed by late antiquity, when Neoplatonist philosophers took the Orphic origin of Pythagorean teachings at face value. Proclus wrote:
all that Orpheus transmitted through secret discourses connected to the mysteries, Pythagoras learnt thoroughly when he completed the initiation at Libethra in Thrace, and Aglaophamus, the initiator, revealed to him the wisdom about the gods that Orpheus acquired from his mother Calliope.
In the fifteenth century, the Neoplatonic Greek scholar Constantine Lascaris (who found the poem Argonautica Orphica) considered a Pythagorean Orpheus. Bertrand Russell (1947) noted:
The Orphics were an ascetic sect; wine, to them, was only a symbol, as, later, in the Christian sacrament. The intoxication that they sought was that of "enthusiasm," of union with the god. They believed themselves, in this way, to acquire mystic knowledge not obtainable by ordinary means. This mystical element entered into Greek philosophy with Pythagoras, who was a reformer of Orphism as Orpheus was a reformer of the religion of Dionysus. From Pythagoras Orphic elements entered into the philosophy of Plato, and from Plato into most later philosophy that was in any degree religious.

Study of early Orphic and Pythagorean sources, however, is more ambiguous concerning their relationship, and authors writing closer to Pythagoras' own lifetime never mentioned his supposed initiation into Orphism, and in general regarded Orpheus himself as a mythological figure. Despite this, even these authors of the 5th and 4th centuries BC noted a strong similarity between the two doctrines. In fact, some claimed that rather than being an initiate of Orphism, Pythagoras was actually the original author of the first Orphic texts. Specifically, Ion of Chios claimed that Pythagoras authored poetry which he attributed to the mythical Orpheus, and Epigenes, in his On Works Attributed to Orpheus, attributed the authorship of several influential Orphic poems to notable early Pythagoreans, including Cercops. According to Cicero, Aristotle also claimed that Orpheus never existed, and that the Pythagoreans ascribed some Orphic poems to Cercon (see Cercops).

Belief in metempsychosis was common to both currents, although it also seems to contain differences. Where the Orphics taught about a cycle of grievous embodiments that could be escaped through their rites, Pythagoras seemed to teach about an eternal, neutral metempsychosis against which personal actions would be irrelevant.

The Neoplatonists regarded the theology of Orpheus, carried forward through Pythagoreanism, as the core of the original Greek religious tradition. 
Proclus, an influentual neoplatonic philosopher, one of the last major classical philosophers of late antiquity, says 
“For all the Grecian theology is the progeny of the mystic tradition of Orpheus; Pythagoras first of all learning from Aglaophemus the rites of the Gods, but Plato in the second place receiving an all-perfect science of the divinities from the Pythagoric and Orphic writings.”
(trans. Thomas Taylor, 1816)

Theogonies 

The Orphic theogonies are genealogical works similar to the Theogony of Hesiod, but the details are different. The theogonies are symbolically similar to Near Eastern models. The main story has it that Zagreus, Dionysus' previous incarnation, is the son of Zeus and Persephone. Zeus names the child as his successor, which angers his wife Hera. She instigates the Titans to murder the child. Zagreus is then tricked with a mirror and children's toys by the Titans, who shred him to pieces and consume him. Athena saves the heart and tells Zeus of the crime, who in turn hurls a thunderbolt on the Titans. The resulting soot, from which sinful mankind is born, contains the bodies of the Titans and Zagreus. The soul of man (the Dionysus part) is therefore divine, but the body (the Titan part) holds the soul in bondage. Thus, it was declared that the soul returns to a host ten times, bound to the wheel of rebirth. Following the punishment, the dismembered limbs of Zagreus were cautiously collected by Apollo who buried them in his sacred land Delphi. In later centuries, these versions underwent a development where Apollo's act of burying became responsible for the reincarnation of Dionysus, thus giving Apollo the title Dionysiodotes (bestower of Dionysus). Apollo plays an important part in the dismemberment myth because he represents the reverting of Encosmic Soul back towards unification.

There are two Orphic stories of the rebirth of Dionysus: in one it is the heart of Dionysus that is implanted into the thigh of Zeus; in the other Zeus has impregnated the mortal woman Semele, resulting in Dionysus's literal rebirth. Many of these details differ from accounts in the classical authors. Damascius says that Apollo "gathers him (Dionysus) together and brings him back up".
The Protogonos, the Eudemian, the Rhapsodic and the Hieronyman theogonies are all reconstructed, discussed and compared in ML West (1983)'s 'The Orphic Poems

The main difference seems to be in the primordial succession:
In the Eudemian theogony, all starts with the Night, which lays an Egg from which Phanes/Protogonos arises.
In the Rhapsodic theogony, it starts with Chronos ('Unageing Time', different from Kronos, Zeus' father) who gives birth to Ether and Chaos, and then lay the egg from which Phanes/Protogonos arises.
In the Hieronyman theogony, the egg arises from soil (more specifically 'the matter out of which earth was coagulated') and water, and it is 'Unageing Time' Kronos which arises from it, and gives birth to Ether, Chaos and Erebus. Then Kronos lay a new egg in Chaos, from which arises Protogonos.
In the Derveni papyrus, a. k. a. the 'Protogonos' theogony, the Night lays the egg from which Protogonos arises, he then give birth to Ouranos & Gaia, which give birth to Kronos, himself father of Zeus who end up swallowing the primordial egg of Protogonos and recreating the Universe in the process.

But there are other differences, notably in the treatment of Dionysos:
In the Eudemian and Rhapsodic theogonies, Dionysos is dismembered and cooked by the Titans before Zeus struck them with lightning (mankind then arises from the soot, and Dionysos is resurrected from his preserved heart).
The Derveni Papyrus being fragmentary, the story stops without having mentioned him.
The Hieronyman theogony do not mention Dionysos being eaten by the Titans in neither source it is known from (Damascius and Athenagoras), despite the latter describing the war on the Titans, which would imply that this story really isn't part of that theogony.

Orphic Egg
In Orphic theogonies, the Orphic Egg is a cosmic egg from which hatched the primordial hermaphroditic deity Phanes/Protogonus (variously equated also with Zeus, Pan, Metis, Eros, Erikepaios and Bromius), who in turn created the other gods. The egg is often depicted with the serpent-like creature, Ananke, wound about it. Phanes is the golden winged primordial being who was hatched from the shining cosmic egg that was the source of the universe. Called Protogonos (First-Born) and Eros (Love)—being the seed of gods and men—Phanes means "to bring light" or "to shine" and is related to the Greek "to shine forth" as well as the Latin "Lucifer". An ancient Orphic hymn addresses him thus:Ineffable, hidden, brilliant scion, whose motion is whirring, you scattered the dark mist that lay before your eyes and, flapping your wings, you whirled about, and through this world you brought pure light.

The Hymns
 The Orphic Hymns are 87 hexametric poems of a shorter length composed in the late Hellenistic or early Roman Imperial age.

Afterlife 

Surviving written fragments show a number of beliefs about the afterlife similar to those in the "Orphic" mythology about Dionysus' death and resurrection. Bone tablets found in Olbia (5th century BC) carry short and enigmatic inscriptions like: "Life. Death. Life. Truth. Dio(nysus). Orphics." The function of these bone tablets is unknown.

Gold-leaf tablets found in graves from Thurii, Hipponium, Thessaly and Crete (4th century BC and after) give instructions to the dead. Although these thin tablets are often highly fragmentary, collectively they present a shared scenario of the passage into the afterlife. When the deceased arrives in the underworld, he is expected to confront obstacles. He must take care not to drink of Lethe ("Forgetfulness"), but of the pool of Mnemosyne ("Memory"). He is provided with formulaic expressions with which to present himself to the guardians of the afterlife. As said in the Petelia tablet:

I am a son of Earth and starry sky. I am parched with thirst and am dying; but quickly grant me cold water from the Lake of Memory to drink.

Other gold leaves offer instructions for addressing the rulers of the underworld:
Now you have died and now you have come into being, O thrice happy one, on this same day. Tell Persephone that the Bacchic One himself released you.

References

Literature 
 Albinus, L. (2000). The house of Hades: Studies in ancient Greek eschatology. Aarhus [Denmark: Aarhus University Press. 
 Alderink, Larry J. Creation and Salvation in Ancient Orphism. University Park: American Philological Association, 1981.  
 Athanassakis, Apostolos N. Orphic Hymns: Text, Translation, and Notes. Missoula: Scholars Press for the Society of Biblical Literature, 1977. 
Baird, William.  History of New Testament Research, volume two: From Jonathan Edwards to Rudolf Bultmann". Minneapolis, Minn: Fortress Press.  2002, 393. 
 Bernabé, Albertus (ed.), Orphicorum et Orphicis similium testimonia et fragmenta. Poetae Epici Graeci. Pars II. Fasc. 1. Bibliotheca Teubneriana, München/Leipzig: K.G. Saur, 2004. 
 Bernabé, Alberto. “Some Thoughts about the ‘New’ Gold Tablet from Pherai.” Zeitschrift für Papyrologie und Epigraphik 166 (2008): 53-58.
 Bernabé, Alberto and Ana Isabel Jiménez San Cristóbal. 2008. Instructions for the Netherworld: the Orphic Gold Tablets. Boston: Brill. 
 Betegh, Gábor. 2006. The Derveni Papyrus: Cosmology, Theology and Interpretation. Cambridge. 
 
 Bremmer, Jan. "Orphism, Pythagoras, and the Rise of the Immortal Soul". The Rise and Fall of the Afterlife: The 1995 Read-Tuckwell Lectures at the University of Bristol. New York: Routledge, 2002. 11-26. 
 Bremmer, Jan. "Rationalization and Disenchantment in Ancient Greece: Max Weber among the Pythagoreans and Orphics?" From Myth to Reason: Studies in the Development of Greek Thought. Ed. Richard Buxton. Oxford: Oxford University Press, 1999. 71-83.
 Brisson, Luc. "Orphée et l'orphisme dans l'antiquité gréco-romaine". Aldershot: Variorum, 1995, env. 200 p. (pagination multiple), .
 Burkert, Walter. 2004. Babylon, Memphis, Persepolis: Eastern Contexts of Greek Culture. Cambridge, MA. 
 Burkert, Walter. "Craft Versus Sect: The Problem of Orphics and Pythagoreans". Jewish and Christian Self-Definition: Volume Three - Self-Definition in the Greco-Roman World. Ed. B. Meyer and E. P. Sanders. Philadelphia: Fortress, 1982.
 Comparetti, Domenico, and Cecil Smith. "The Petelia Gold Tablet". The Journal of Hellenic Studies 3 (1882): 111-18.
Dungan, David L. A History of the Synoptic Problem: The Canon, the Text, the Composition, and the Interpretation of the Gospels. New York: Doubleday, 1999. Print. 54-55. 
 Edmonds, Radcliffe. Myths of the Underworld Journey: Plato, Aristophanes, and the 'Orphic' Gold Tablets. New York: Cambridge University Press, 2004.  
 Edmunds, Radcliffe. “Tearing Apart the Zagreus Myth: A Few Disparaging Remarks on Orphism and Original Sin.” Classical Antiquity 18.1 (1999): 35-73. 
 Finkelberg, Aryeh. "On the Unity of Orphic and Milesian Thought". The Harvard Theological Review 79 (1986): 321-35. ISSN 0017-8160
 Graf, Fritz. Eleusis und die orphische Dichtung Athens. Berlin, New York, 1974 .
 Graf, Fritz. "Dionysian and Orphic Eschatology: New Texts and Old Questions". Masks of Dionysus. Ed. T. Carpenter and C. Faraone. Ithaca: Cornell UP, 1993. 239-58, ISSN 0012-9356.
 Graf, Fritz, and Sarah Iles Johnston. 2007. Ritual texts for the Afterlife: Orpheus and the Bacchic Gold Tablets. Routledge: London, New York, .
 Guthrie, W. K. C. 1935, revised 1952. Orpheus and Greek Religion: A Study of the Orphic Movement. London.
 Harrison, Jane Ellen. Prolegomena to the Study of Greek Religion. Cambridge: Cambridge University Press, 1903.
 Herrero de Jáuregui, Miguel. "Orphism and Christianity in Late Antiquity". Berlin / New York: Walter de Gruyter, 2010, . 
 Kern, Otto. Orphicorum fragmenta, Berolini apud Weidmannos, 1922.
 Linforth, Ivan M. Arts of Orpheus. New York: Arno Press, 1973.
 Martin, Luther H. Hellenistic Religions: An Introduction 1987, 102, .
 Nilsson, Martin. "Early Orphism and Kindred Religious Movements". The Harvard Theological Review 28.3 (1935): 181–230.
 Parker, Robert. "Early Orphism" The Greek World. Ed. Anton Powell. New York: Routledge, 1995. 483–510, .
 Pugliese Carratelli, Giovanni. 2001. Le lamine doro orfiche. Milano, Libri Scheiwiller. 
 Robertson, Noel. “Orphic Mysteries and Dionysiac Ritual.” Greek Mysteries: the Archaeology and Ritual of Ancient Greek Secret Cults. Ed. Michael B. Cosmopoulos. New York: Routledge, 2004. 218-40, .
 Russo, Attilio (2004). "Costantino Lascaris tra fama e oblio nel Cinquecento messinese", Archivio Storico Messinese, Messina 2003-2004, LXXXIV-LXXXV, 5–87, especially 53–54. 
  Sournia Alain. Chap. "Sapesse orientale et philosophie occidentale : la période axiale" in Fondements d'une philosophie sauvage. Connaissances et savoirs, 2012, 300 p., .
 Tierney, M. "The Origins of Orphism". The Irish Theological Quarterly 17 (1922): 112–27.
 West, Martin L. "Graeco-Oriental Orphism in the 3rd cent. BC". Assimilation et résistence à la culture Gréco-romaine dans le monde ancient: Travaux du VIe Congrès International d’Etudes Classiques. Ed. D. M. Pippidi. Paris: Belles Lettres, 1976. 221–26.
 West, Martin L. 1983. Orphic Poems. Oxford, .
 Wroe, Ann. Orpheus: The Song of Life, The Overlook Press, New York: 2012, . 
 Zuntz, Günther. Persephone: Three Essays on Religion and Thought in Magna Graecia''. Oxford: Clarendon Press, 1971, .

Further reading

External links

 Online Text: The Orphic Hymns translated by Thomas Taylor
 The Orphic Hymns translated by Thomas Taylor – alternative version
 Alexander Fol, Orphica Magica I, Sofia 2004
 Rosicrucian Digest vol. 87 devoted entirely to Orphism
 Edmonds, Radcliffe. “Tearing Apart the Zagreus Myth: A Few Disparaging Remarks on Orphism and Original Sin.” Classical Antiquity 18.1 (1999): 35-73.
 A Genealogy of Philosophic Enlightenment in Classical Greece
 Orphism in the modern world

Ancient Greek religion
Greco-Roman mysteries
Orpheus